South Carolina Highway 310 (SC 310) is an  long state highway in the southeastern part of the U.S. state of South Carolina. The highway travels in a south-north orientation from Holly Hill north to Vance, and then northwest to its northern terminus, completely within Orangeburg County.

Route description
SC 310 begins at an intersection with US 176/SC 453 Truck in Holly Hill. The highway heads north concurrently with SC 453 Truck to a roundabout with SC 45, north of the city. Here, the truck route follows SC 45, while SC 310 continues to the north. It enters the city of Vance, where it intersects SC 210. After leaving Vance, SC 310 heads northwest and meets its northern terminus, an intersection with SC 6, just northwest of the city.

SC 310 is not part of the National Highway System, a system of roadways important to the nation's economy, defense, and mobility.

History

Major intersections

See also

References

External links

 
 SC 310 at Virginia Highways' South Carolina Highways Annex

310
Transportation in Orangeburg County, South Carolina